The Slovenian border barrier is a border barrier constructed by Slovenia in 2015–2016 on its border with Croatia as a response to the European migrant crisis. Both Slovenia and Croatia are European Union members, therefore the barrier is located on an internal EU border; but previously only Slovenia was a member of the free travel Schengen Area, which Croatia joining the area in 2023. In March 2016, Slovenia announced that only migrants who apply for asylum in Slovenia and those with clear humanitarian needs will be allowed to enter Slovenian territory.

History

In November 2015, Slovenia started construction of the barrier consisting of razor wire. The stated aim of the barrier is to control the flow of refugees and migrants, while the border stays open. The 400 mile border between Slovenia and Croatia forms the southeastern border of the Schengen Area, the passport-free zone shared by members states of the European Union. Hundreds of thousands of migrants have attempted to enter the Schengen Area in 2015, with over 171,000 of refugees of the wars in Afghanistan and Syria crossing into Slovenia from Croatia since Hungary closed its border on 16 October 2015. The flow of migrants may be diverted to routes crossing through Albania and Italy.

In March 2016, Slovenia barred migrants from transiting through its territory and announced that only migrants who apply for asylum in Slovenia and those with clear humanitarian needs will be allowed to enter Slovenian territory. In reaction, Serbia announced closure of its borders with Macedonia and Bulgaria to migrants without valid documents.

As of January 1, 2023, all land borders and barriers dividing Croatia and Slovenia have been removed due to Croatia’s accession to Schengen Area.

Environmental impact
Croatia complained to the EU that the Slovenian fence is an obstacle for migration of wildlife such as deer and that "Slovenia is violating European legislation on the conservation of natural habitats and the environment". The razor-wire fence laid by Slovenia in December 2015 on the border with western Croatian regions of Istria and Gorski kotar endangeres the habitat of the wolf and the brown bear, both of which are protected by law in Croatia. Local hunters have found deer killed by the fence. The WWF and the inhabitants of the regions from both sides of the border have protested against the decision to put up the razor-wire fence.

See also
Austrian border barrier
Bulgarian border barrier
Greek border barrier
Hungarian border barrier
Macedonian border barrier
Norway–Russia border barrier
Croatia–Slovenia relations
Croatia–Slovenia border disputes

References 

Border barriers constructed during the European migrant crisis
Fortifications in Slovenia
Croatia–Slovenia border
2015 establishments in Slovenia